The Repair Shop is a British daytime television show made by production company Ricochet that aired on BBC Two for series 1 to 3 and on BBC One for series 4 onwards, in which family heirlooms are restored for their owners by numerous experts with a broad range of specialisms. Furniture restorer Jay Blades acts as the foreman.

Theme
Each episode follows professional craftspeople from around the country who restore family heirlooms that have sentimental value for their owners. Heirlooms are found mostly through social media, and their owners are not charged for the restorations.

Viewers find out about the emotional family stories and events behind the pieces, before enjoying the sight of the technical skills and progress used to bring the pieces back to looking more cared for and in working order.

Episodes

: An episode billed as "Series 9, Episode 1" aired as a one-off on 29 December 2021. However, Series 9 did not officially start until 14 March 2022 with a different Episode 1, and the previously aired episode is scheduled to repeat in this run as Episodes 6 or 20.

: Series 10 officially started 11 May 2022 half way through Series 9 and had ended 5 October 2022 before 20 more episodes were commissioned for Series 9.

: Series 12 will officially start sometime in the Springtime of 2023 with 14 episodes commissioned before 20 more episodes would be commissioned for Series 11.

The Repair Shop at Christmas
Several Christmas-themed special episodes with the exception of The Repair Shop at Christmas 2018 have been produced:

Notable artists
Episode 5 of series 1 featured a painted ceramic jug made by Picasso contemporary Jean Lurçat.

Episode 12 of series 1 featured a painting by British landscape artist Frederick Appleyard. Brought in by Appleyard's descendant —his great-grand-nephew— the heavily damaged painting was restored by Lucia Scalisi.

In episode 16 of the same series, she restored an oil portrait by C. J. Frost, at the request of its owner, the sitter's son.

In series 4, episode 22, a miniature by Sarah Biffen was restored, by Scalisi and paper conservator Louise Drover.

Notable guests 
In October 2022, King Charles III (then still the Prince of Wales) starred in an episode in which a piece of pottery made for Queen Victoria's Diamond Jubilee and an 18th-century clock were restored by the show's experts. Jay Blades, Steve Fletcher, Kirsten Ramsay and Will Kirk were featured.

Filming

The Repair Shop is filmed at the Weald and Downland Living Museum in Singleton, West Sussex. The Court Barn is the principal setting, though some repairs are carried out in the Victorian smithy and nearby wagon shed.

Experts

Regular
 Jay Blades, furniture restorer and foreman
 Dominic ('Dom') Chinea, metal worker and signs restorer
 Steven ('Steve') Fletcher (brother of Suzie), clock restorer
 Suzie Fletcher (sister of Steve), leather worker, saddle maker
 Will Kirk, carpenter and cabinet-maker
 Sonnaz Nooranvary, upholstery restorer
 Amanda Middleditch and Julie Tatchell, soft toy restorers, known as the "Bear Ladies"
 Kirsten Ramsay, Sussex-based ceramics conservator
 Lucia Scalisi, painting conservator
 Brenton West, silversmith and antique photography specialist

Guest & Semi-Regular experts

 Mark Stuckey, electronics and electrical restorer
 Stuart Black, firefighting historian
 George Blackman, antique typewriter restorer
 Matthew Boultwood, blacksmith
 John Dilworth, violin restorer
 Louise Drover, paper conservator
 Neil Fairley, vintage electronics repairer
 Catherine Guilder, historian
 Tim Gunn, bicycle restorer
 Geoff Harvey, pinball and arcade machine restorer
 Sarah Hatton, willow artist
 Stephen Kember, music box specialist
 Pete Woods, percussion and musical instrument repairer
 Sara Dennis, embroidery specialist
 David Kennett, luthier, guitar restorer
 Graham Mancha, furniture restorer
 Matthew Nickels, stained-glass worker
 Guillaume Pons, ceramics restorer
 Laurence Richardson, jukebox restorer
 Richard Rigby, antique projector specialist
 Greg Rowland, wheelwright
 Joujou Saad and Walid Saad, antique typewriter restorers, known as the "Mr & Mrs Vintage Typewriters"
 Christopher Shaw, book-binder
 Alastair Simms, master cooper
 Kaviraj Singh, sitar restorer
 Rachael South, London-based furniture caner
 Richard Talman, master goldsmith
 Roger Thomas, accordion specialist
 Julyan Wallis, luthier
 Tim Weeks, gramophone specialist
 Hannah Weston Smith, furniture restorer
 Dean Westmoreland, cobbler, shoe repairer
 David Burville, organ restorer, toy repairer 
 Blue MacMurchie, John MacMurchie, bagpipes restorers
 Jayesh Vaghela, hatter
 Kouresh Kouchakpour, luthier
 Nigel Robinson, electronics engineer

Merchandise

Home media
DVD releases of the series are released by Dazzler Media under license from Warner Bros.

On 25 June 2018, a DVD release of The Complete Series 1 and 2017 Christmas Special was released on a two-disc DVD set. A DVD release of Series Two was released on 7 October 2019. A DVD of Series 3 was released in March 2020, Series 4 was released as a two-disc set in March 2021, and Series 5 was released as a two-disc set in November 2021.

Books
On 25 July 2019, a do-it-yourself hardback book was released, entitled The Repair Shop: A Make Do and Mend Handbook, published by BBC Books.

The Repair Shop: Tales from the Workshop of Dreams was published by BBC Books on 5 November 2020.

Reception
In 2019, The Repair Shop received a nomination for a Rose d'Or in the Reality and Factual Entertainment category. After moving to prime time for Series 6 in March 2020, it was watched by 6.7 million people.

International versions
An Australian version of the show, The Repair Shop Australia, debuted on Lifestyle on 3 May 2022. It is hosted by Dean Ipaviz, a builder and carpenter, and features six repairers.

A Dutch version of the show, The Repair Shop, debuted on RTL 4 on September 2, 2019. It is hosted by Humberto Tan, a radio and TV presenter, sports journalist, and writer.

References

External links
 
 

2017 British television series debuts
2010s British television series
2020s British television series
Antiques television series
BBC Television shows
British reality television series
English-language television shows
Television series by Warner Bros. Television Studios